Idriss Harouna (born 11 November 1979) is a former Nigerian football player.

References
 

1979 births
Living people
Nigerian footballers
Safa SC players
Nigerian expatriate footballers
Expatriate footballers in Lebanon
FC Rostov players
Russian Premier League players
Expatriate footballers in Russia
AC Bellinzona players
Expatriate footballers in Switzerland
Nigerian sportsmen
Association football midfielders
Nigerian expatriate sportspeople in Lebanon
Lebanese Premier League players